Berikovo is a village in the municipality of Kičevo, North Macedonia. It used to be part of the former municipality of Oslomej.

Demographics
As of the 2021 census, Berikovo had 34 residents with the following ethnic composition:
Albanians 30
Persons for whom data are taken from administrative sources 4

According to the 2002 census, the village had a total of 168 inhabitants. Ethnic groups in the village include:
Albanians 168

References

 

Villages in Kičevo Municipality
Villages in North Macedonia
Albanian communities in North Macedonia